Ishak Djober (born on August 3, 1989) is an Indonesian footballer who currently plays for Persepam Madura United in the Indonesia Super League.

References

External links

1989 births
Association football midfielders
Living people
Indonesian footballers
Liga 1 (Indonesia) players
Indonesian Premier Division players
Persikota Tangerang players
Persepam Madura Utama players
Sportspeople from Papua